Vanity Tonja Caroll Lewerissa (born 1 April 1991) is a Dutch football midfielder currently playing for Ajax in the Dutch Eredivisie. She previously played in the Belgian 1st Division for Standard Liège, with whom she has also played the Champions League. As a junior international she played the 2010 U-19 European Championship. She made her debut in the senior Netherlands women's national football team on 6 March 2015 in a match against Finland and was part of the squads at the 2015 FIFA Women's World Cup and the winning team of the UEFA Women's Euro 2017.

Honours
Netherlands
 UEFA Women's Euro (1): 2017

References

External links
  Profile  at Onsoranje.nl

1991 births
Living people
Dutch women's footballers
Netherlands women's international footballers
Eredivisie (women) players
Footballers from Maastricht
2015 FIFA Women's World Cup players
Women's association football midfielders
Standard Liège (women) players
PSV (women) players
Expatriate women's footballers in Belgium
Dutch expatriate sportspeople in Belgium
VVV-Venlo (women) players
UEFA Women's Championship-winning players
Knights of the Order of Orange-Nassau
Dutch expatriate women's footballers
Dutch people of Indonesian descent
UEFA Women's Euro 2017 players